Alan John Scarfe (born 8 June 1946) is a British–Canadian actor, stage director and author. He is a former Associate Director of the Stratford Festival (1976–77) and the Everyman Theatre in Liverpool (1967–68). He won the 1985 Genie Award for Best Performance by an Actor in a Supporting Role for his role in The Bay Boy and earned two other Genie best actor nominations for Deserters (1984) and Overnight (1986) and a Gemini Award nomination for best actor in aka Albert Walker (2003). He won a Jessie Award for best actor in 2005 for his performance in Trying at the Vancouver Playhouse. In 2006 he won the Jury Prize for best supporting actor at the Austin Fantastic Fest in The Hamster Cage and the Vancouver Film Critics Circle honorary award for lifetime achievement.

Personal life
Scarfe was born in Harpenden, England, the son of Gladys Ellen (née Hunt) and Neville Vincent Scarfe, both university professors. Neville Scarfe was the Founding Dean of the Faculty of Education at UBC and served in that position from 1956 to 1973. Alan has a son named Jonathan Scarfe who is also an actor and director. He was married to Barbara March from 1979 until her death from cancer in 2019. They had a daughter named Antonia (Tosia) Scarfe who is a musician and composer. Jonathan and Tosia collaborated on the short film Speak, Jonathan as director, Tosia as composer and performer of the title song, which won the Grand Jury Prize in the Short Category at Dances with Films in Los Angeles in 2001. He has two brothers; Colin Scarfe who was a professor of astronomy at the University of Victoria, and Brian Scarfe, who was a professor of economics at the University of Manitoba, University of Alberta, University of Regina, a senior university administrator at Alberta and Regina, and an Economics Consultant.

Scarfe describes himself as a lifelong atheist.

Career
He trained at the London Academy of Music and Dramatic Art (1964–66) and began his career as a classical stage actor. He has performed well over 100 major roles in theatres across Europe (London, Liverpool, Coventry, Paris, Lille, Copenhagen, The Hague, Madrid, Warsaw, Kraków, Moscow and St. Petersburg), Canada (eight seasons at the Stratford Festival, 1972-3, 1976–9, 1985, 1992, two seasons at the Shaw Festival, 1970, 1974, as well as Vancouver, Calgary, Toronto, Montreal and Halifax) and the United States (New York, Boston, New Haven, Stamford, Philadelphia, Seattle, Dallas and Los Angeles), including King Lear, Othello, Hamlet, Iago, Brutus, Cassius, Petruchio, Prospero, Cyrano de Bergerac, Doctor Faustus, Luther, Uncle Vanya, Verlaine, John Barrymore in Sheldon Rosen's Ned and Jack and Harras in Zuckmayer's The Devil's General. He is also a stage director whose productions have ranged from the works of Shakespeare to Albee, Brecht, Beckett, Arthur Miller, Harold Pinter, Yevgeny Schwarz and Preston Jones.

He has also been a familiar face on television and film for more than forty years. He played NSA member Dr. Bradley Talmadge, the director of the Backstep Project operations, on the UPN series Seven Days. He also had guest roles as two separate Romulan characters in Star Trek: The Next Generation and as Magistrate Augris in the Star Trek: Voyager episode "Resistance". In 2003 he co-starred with his son Jonathan in Burn: The Robert Wraight Story.

After returning to Canada from Los Angeles in 2002, he began writing novels under the pseudonym Clanash Farjeon (an anagram of his full name). The titles include A Handbook for Attendants on the Insane: the Autobiography of Jack the Ripper as Revealed to Clanash Farjeon (which has been called 'one of the finest books on historical crime ever published'), The Vampires of Ciudad Juarez, about the hypocrisy of the War on Drugs and the tragedy of 'las desaparecidas', The Vampires of 9/11, a political satire about America's blindness and inability to accept who the real culprits are, and the third book of the trilogy Vampires of the Holy Spirit completes the story in Rome during April 2005, the beginning of the papacy of Joseph Ratzinger. The first three can also be found in Italian (originally published by Gargoyle Books in Rome which since the death of the editor Paolo de Crescenzo in 2013 has closed its doors) under the titles Le Memorie di Jack lo Squartatore, I vampiri di Ciudad Juarez (both translated by Chiara Vatteroni) and I vampiri dell'11 settembre (translated by Stefania Sapuppo). In March 2014 Mosaic Press published The Autobiography of Jack the Ripper as revealed to Clanash Farjeon but this is no longer an approved edition. All four novels have now been republished, fully revised and without the pseudonym, by Smart House Books and have been retitled as The Revelation of Jack the Ripper, and the 'Carnivore Trilogy' as The Vampires of Juarez, The Demons of 9/11, and The Mask of the Holy Spirit.

The Vampires of Juarez was awarded the 2018 BIBA Star. The Revelation of Jack the Ripper won the 2019 BIBA (Best Indie Book Award). The Mask of the Holy Spirit won the 2020 BIBA for Satire.

Partial filmography
The Bitter Ash (1963) – Des
Cathy's Curse (1977) – George Gimble
Murder by Phone (1982) – John Websole
The Wars (1983) – Capt. Leather
Deserters (1983) – Sergeant Ulysses Hawley
The Bay Boy (1984) – Sgt. Tom Coldwell
Walls (1984) – Ron Simmons
Joshua Then and Now (1985) – Jack Trimble
Overnight (1985) – Vladimir Jezda
Keeping Track (1986) – Royle Wishart
Street Justice (1987) – Eugene Powers
Iron Eagle II (1988) – Col. Vardovsky
Kingsgate (1989) – Daniel Kingsgate
Divided Loyalties (1990) – George Washington
Double Impact (1991) – Nigel Griffith
Lethal Weapon 3 (1992) – Herman Walters
The Portrait (1993) – David Severn
Gunsmoke: One Man's Justice (1994) – Sean Devlin
Back in Business (1997) – David Ashby
The Wrong Guy (1997) – Farmer Brown
Silence (1997) – Lawyer
Sanctuary (1998) – William Dyson 
Seven Days (7 October 1998  – 29 May 2001)
The Hamster Cage (2005) – Phil
Babylon 5: The Lost Tales (2007) – Father Cassidy

References

External links
 
 
 

1946 births
20th-century English male actors
21st-century English male actors
Male actors from London
Canadian atheists
Canadian male film actors
Canadian male stage actors
Canadian male television actors
English atheists
English emigrants to Canada
English male film actors
English male stage actors
English male television actors
Best Supporting Actor Genie and Canadian Screen Award winners
Living people
20th-century Canadian male actors
21st-century Canadian male actors